Talk About It EP is an EP by former Deep Purple, Black Sabbath and Trapeze vocalist/ bassist Glenn Hughes.  It was released in 1997 on SPV and was taken from the album Addiction. It includes three previously unreleased live tracks.

Additional tracks 
The first live track is a version of the Phenomena song Kiss Of Fire.  It was recorded at Citta' Kawasaki, Japan on 24 May 1994 and is taken from the same recordings as the live album Burning Japan Live.

The second track is an acoustic version of Coast To Coast, a track originally released on the Trapeze album You Are the Music...We're Just the Band and also included on the Hughes/Thrall record.  It was recorded at Echo House Studio, Japan on 7 July 1995.

The third track is an acoustic version of the Deep Purple song You Keep On Moving from the album Come Taste the Band.  It was recorded at Studio Terra, Japan on February 26, 1994.

Track listing 
 "Talk About It" – 4:48 (Bonilla, Hughes)
 "Kiss Of Fire (live)" – 6:39 (Bailey, Galley)
 "Coast To Coast (acoustic)" – 6:49 (Hughes)
 "You Keep On Moving (live & acoustic)" – 5:29 (Coverdale, Hughes)

Personnel
Track 1
Glenn Hughes – Vocals/ Bass
Marc Bonilla – Guitars/ Keyboards
Joakim Marsh – Guitars
Joe Travers – Drums
R. Gaylor – Vocal Channeling

Track 2
 Glenn Hughes – Vocals
 Thomas Larsson – Guitars/ Backing Vocals
 Eric Bojfeldt – Guitars/ Backing Vocals
 John Levén – Bass
 Ian Haugland – Drums
 Mic Michaeli – Keyboards/ Backing Vocals

Track 3
 Glenn Hughes – Vocals/ Additional Keyboards
 George Nastos – Guitars
 Dave Patton – Guitars

Track 4
 Glenn Hughes – Vocals
 Thomas Larsson – Guitars
 Eric Bojfeldt – Guitars

References

External links
 Talk About It EP entry at ghpg.net

Glenn Hughes albums
1997 debut EPs